Albania has 4 main lagoons. They are listed as follows:

List of lagoons in Albania

Other lagoons include Vilun, Kunë-Vain, and Orikum.

See also  

 Protected areas of Albania
 Geography of Albania

References 

 

Lakes
Landforms of Albania